The 2019 Six Nations Under 20s Championship was the 12th series of the Six Nations Under 20s Championship, the annual northern hemisphere rugby union championship. France were the defending champions. Ireland won the tournament and a Grand Slam, after winning all five of their matches.

Participants

Final table

Table ranking rules
 Four match points are awarded for a win.
 Two match points are awarded for a draw.
 A bonus match point is awarded to a team that scores four or more tries in a match or loses a match by seven points or fewer. If a team scores four tries in a match and loses by seven points or fewer, they are awarded both bonus points.
 Three bonus match points are awarded to a team that wins all five of their matches (known as a Grand Slam). This ensures that a Grand Slam winning team reaches a minimum of 23 points, and thus always ranks over a team who won four matches in which they also were awarded four try bonus points and were also awarded two bonus points (a try bonus and a losing bonus) in the match that they lost for a total of 22 points.
 Tie-breakers
 If two or more teams are tied on match points, the team with the better points difference (points scored less points conceded) is ranked higher.
 If the above tie-breaker fails to separate tied teams, the team that scored the higher number of total tries in their matches is ranked higher.
 If two or more teams remain tied for first place at the end of the championship after applying the above tiebreakers, the title is shared between them.

Fixtures

Week 1

Week 2

Week 3

Week 4

Week 5

Player statistics

Top points scorers

Top try scorers

See also
2019 Six Nations Championship
2019 Women's Six Nations Championship

References

External links
Under-20 Six Nations 

2019
2019 rugby union tournaments for national teams
2018–19 in English rugby union
2018–19 in French rugby union
2018–19 in Irish rugby union
2018–19 in Italian rugby union
2018–19 in Scottish rugby union
2018–19 in Welsh rugby union
Under 20
February 2019 sports events in Europe
February 2019 sports events in the United Kingdom
March 2019 sports events in Europe
March 2019 sports events in the United Kingdom